The 1998–99 Hertha BSC season started on 16 August 1998 against Werder Bremen and ended on 29 May 1999.

Review and events

Results

Legend

Bundesliga

DFB-Pokal

Roster and statistics

Sources:

|}

References

Match reports

Other sources

External links

Hertha BSC
Hertha BSC seasons